Allium haemanthoides (Kurdish: Loosha) is a species of flowering plant in the Amaryllidaceae family. It is native to Iraq and Iran. It is a bulb-forming perennial with a densely packed umbel of white flowers with dark mideveins on the tepals.

References

haemanthoides
Onions
Flora of Iran
Flora of Iraq
Plants described in 1875
Taxa named by Pierre Edmond Boissier
Taxa named by George François Reuter
Taxa named by Eduard August von Regel